The 4th Bengal European Cavalry was a cavalry regiment of the British East India Company, created in 1858 and disbanded in 1859.

The regiment was originally raised in Bengal by the East India Company in 1858 as the 4th Bengal European Light Cavalry, for service in the Indian Mutiny; the "European" in the name indicated that the soldiers were white, and not Indian sowars.

As with all other "European" units of the Company, they were placed under the command of the Crown following the end of the Mutiny in 1858, but the regiment was disbanded rather than be transferred into the British Army. When it was proposed that the "European" units be transferred into the British Army there was a period of considerable unrest, known as the "White mutiny". The mutiny successfully achieved concessions from the British Government, allowing soldiers to opt for free discharges and passage home as an alternative to transferring into the British Army, and many soldiers took advantage of the scheme.

See also
 Bengal Army

References

Honourable East India Company regiments
Military units and formations established in 1858
Military units and formations disestablished in 1859
Bengal European
Bengal Presidency
Bengal European Cavalry